Fred Bedford (25 June 1902 – 18 January 1972) was an English professional footballer who played as an outside right for Lancaster Town, Tranmere Rovers and Morecambe. He also played for Bradford City, signing for them in October 1928 from Morecambe; he returned to Morecambe in August 1929. He scored 8 goals in 9 appearances in the Football League for Bradford City.

References

1902 births
1972 deaths
English footballers
Bradford City A.F.C. players
English Football League players
Lancaster City F.C. players
Tranmere Rovers F.C. players
Morecambe F.C. players
Association football wingers
Footballers from Blackburn